April Kisses is a solo jazz guitar album by Bucky Pizzarelli that was released in 1999. Seven tracks were composed by Carl Kress. The title track was written by Eddie Lang.

Track listing

 "Helena"
 "April Kisses"
 "Afterthoughts, Part 1"
 "Afterthoughts, Part 2"
 "Afterthoughts, Part 3"
 "The End of a Love Affair"
 "Slow Burning"
 "Tears"
 "Love Song"
 "It Must Be True"
 "Indy Annie"
 "Sutton Mutton"
 "Come Sunday"
 "Squattin' at the Grotto"
 "Please"
 "Smoke Gets in Your Eyes"
 "Slamerino"
 "Peg Leg Shuffle"
 "Stompin' for Boz"
 "Silk City Blues"

Personnel

Bucky Pizzarelli – guitar, solo

References

2000 albums
Bucky Pizzarelli albums
Swing albums
Arbors Records albums
Instrumental albums